Rendufinho is a Portuguese Freguesia in the municipality of Póvoa de Lanhoso, it has an area of 8.86 km² and 736 inhabitants (2011). And a population density of 83.1 people per km².

Population

References 

Freguesias of Póvoa de Lanhoso